Leilua Pilia'e Iuliano (16 January 1900 – March 1974) was a Western Samoan politician. He was a member of the Legislative Assembly from 1957 until 1973.

Biography
Iuliano was born in 1900 and educated at Catholic schools in Apia. He worked for several companies, and was conferred with the Pilia'e chiefly title in his 20s. He became a member of the Fono of Faipule and was involved with local government.

Iuliano was elected to the Legislative Assembly from the A'ana Alofi No. 2 constituency in the 1957 elections, going onto become an MLA renowned for his oratory skills. He was a member of the 1960 Constitutional Assembly and a signatory of the constitution. He was re-elected in A'ana Alofi No. 2 in 1961 and 1964, before successfully running in Fa'asaleleaga No. 2 in the 1967 elections. He was re-elected again in 1970, before retiring prior to the 1973 elections.

He died in March 1974 at the age of 70, survived by his wife and eleven children.

References

1900 births
Samoan chiefs
Members of the Legislative Assembly of Samoa
1974 deaths